The Kadamba dynasty of Banavasi ruled parts of south-western India between 4th and 6th centuries. Other dynasties with this name include:

 Kadamba dynasty
 Kadambas of Halasi
 Kadambas of Hangal
 Kadambas of Goa
 Kadambas of Bayalnadu (Vainadu)